The Australian Agricultural Company (AACo) is a public-listed Australian company that, as at 2018, owned and operated feedlots and farms covering around  of land in Queensland and the Northern Territory, roughly one percent of Australia's land mass. As of July 2008 AACo had a staff of 500 and operated 24 cattle stations and two feedlots, consisting of over 565,000 beef cattle.

Founding of the company 
The inquiry into the colony of New South Wales conducted by John Bigge from 1819 to 1823 recommended that large grants of land be given to "men of real capital" who would utilise significant levels of convict labour to maintain these estates. The inquiry was initiated by the Earl of Bathurst and John Macarthur to protect both the system of land grants to wealthy individuals and also the transportation system of cheap prison labor to the colony. As a result of the Bigge Inquiry, the Australian Agricultural Company (A.A.Co.) was formed by an Act of the British Parliament and incorporated by royal charter on 1 November 1824 for the cultivation and improvement of waste lands in the colony of New South Wales and other purposes, amongst which was the production of fine merino wool for export to Great Britain. A group of about 400 well-connected British investors funded the company with a combined capital of one million pounds (made up of ten thousand shares of £100 each). A grant of one million acres (about 405,000 hectares) was obtained in the colony for agricultural development, subject to the performance of certain conditions, with the company to be allowed to select the location of the grant.  

Among the principal members of this company were the Attorney-General and the Solicitor-General of England, 28 members of Parliament, including Mr. Brougham, and Joseph Hume, the Governor, Deputy Governor and eight of the directors of the Bank of England; the Chairman and Deputy-Chairman and five directors of the British East India Company, besides many other eminent bankers and merchants of England. There were 41 investors based in New South Wales which included some of the wealthiest colonists such as the Macarthur family and Phillip Parker King.

The initial million acres selected under the founding charter extended from Port Stephens, embracing the Karuah River valley, to the Gloucester flats, and included all of the coastal region north to the Manning River. The company commenced its operations in 1826 with its first manager Robert Dawson, who stocked the property with flocks of Merino sheep. The wool produced by the company was to be exported to Great Britain to ensure a cheap reliable supply of British wool which at that time was being outpriced by German imports.

However, it soon found that better land was available and, in 1830, a communication from the Secretary of State for the Colonies to Governor Darling notified the latter that the company was to be permitted to select land in the interior of the colony, in lieu of an equivalent area at Port Stephens, but retaining mineral rights to the latter. After an inspection in 1833, the company decided on two new areas. The township of West Tamworth adjacent to the present city was the original company-owned business centre for the area. In 1856, Arthur Hodgson was appointed general superintendent of the company. The pioneering settlers of the area were ordered to leave and paid little from the company for their properties.

Convicts soon became the companies largest type of employee, although those who had served a sentence, aborigines and indentured servants on seven-year contracts were also employed with the latter making up the bulk of initial employees. The AACo attempted to exploit convict labour to generate a profit. When the supply of convicts was facing potential limits in the mid-1830s, company directors attempted to source convicts from the city-state of Hamburg.

It is one of Australia's oldest still-operating companies. Its headquarters are today in Brisbane and it has been listed (or relisted) on the Australian Stock Exchange since 2001.

Coal 

The colonial government was not able to manage coal production efficiently. On 3 May 1833 the company received land grants at Newcastle totaling  plus a 31-year monopoly on that town's coal traffic. The company became the largest exporter of coal from Newcastle for many decades. Because of drought and depression during the 1840s mining created more profit than wool production did.

By December 1903 the pit was sending a fully loaded train away each day. In May 1906 the company purchased a half-share in the Aberdare Junction to Cessnock railway for £40,000 which, already owning the other half, placed them in full ownership of the line. With the post-Great War slump, the company ceased its coal-mining activities in the early 1920s, sold their assets therein, and moved on into the cattle industry.

The AACo's coat-of-arms are affixed to two stone columns erected in Gordon Avenue, Hamilton (originally known as Pittown, Borehole or Happy Flat)located on the corners Learmonth Park (Alexander Street and Gordon Avenue, and Jenner Parade and Gordon Avenue)in an area once known as Newcastle's garden suburb.

Australia's first railway
On 10 December 1831 the Australian Agricultural Company officially opened Australia's first railway, located at the intersection of Brown & Church Streets, Newcastle, New South Wales. Privately owned and operated to service the A Pit coal mine, it was a cast-iron fishbelly rail on an inclined plane as a gravitational railway, described as follows:

The AACo constructed a total of three gravitational railways: the second was in 1837 to service B Pit and the third was in mid-1842 to service C Pit. The gravitational railway from B Pit connected with the 1831 railway. The gravitational railway from C Pit, which made use of the last of the government’s offer of cheap convict labour, feed onto an extended gravitational railway to reach the port. It is presumed that when the A Pit mine was exhausted in July 1846 its railway was directly transferred to form the C Pit railway, although no hard evidence can support this thought.

On 10 December 2006 a plaque was unveiled on the southern shore of Newcastle Harbour celebrating this event.

Short-lived coal monopoly and providing land access: disputes with James Mitchell
Further, it was feared that the company may have had control of the entire coal supply in the Colony had the Crown Law Officers responsible for the substitution of a grant for the lease not objected and an alternative agreed upon.

Between 1835 and 1850, the AACo was involved in significant Australian historical law events relating to monopolistic coal mining and private railway access.

Not long after Ludwig Leichhardt’s visit to the Burwood estate in 1842, Mitchell announced the planned commissioning of tramroad tunnels, Australia’s first two railway tunnels, through Burwood ridge (or bluff).

While Leichhardt visited the Burwood estate he drew up the stratigraphy of the coastline. It is speculated that Leichhardt may have established the extent of the coal seams under Mitchell’s property. Mitchell claimed the construction of the tunnels was to allow access to Burwood Beach in order to build a salt works. It is further speculated that Mitchell actually sought to destroy the Australian Agricultural Company’s legal monopoly on coal mining. Prior to these events Mitchell had already approached Governor Gipps seeking: 
 a repeal of the Metallic Ores Act;
 Newcastle be made a free port and
 that he be permitted to mine and use coal from Burwood estate as fuel for a copper smelter.

Mitchell was unsuccessful with only his request to use coal as fuel in a copper smelter.

Although Mitchell had no legal use of coal, the commissioned tunnel project commenced in 1846 with the cutting line being directly into a coal seam. Between 2 and 3 thousand tonnes of coal were extracted but unusable owing to the AACo's monopoly.

While Mitchell’s operations were going on, a number of small illegal mines operated in the district in defiance of the monopoly. A mine near East Maitland operated by Mr James Brown undercut the AACo's price to supply coal to steamships at Morpeth which led to prosecution. The government’s legal advice after this case was that they would have to individually prosecute every illegal mine, which Governor FitzRoy believed the cost of the prosecutions should be paid for by the Australian Agricultural Company. In 1847, the NSW Legislative Council created the Coal Inquiry and appointed a select committee to investigate the matter. Both Mitchell and Brown gave evidence; Mitchell in relation to his tunnel and Brown in relation to price cutting. Before the committee could issue any recommendations, the Australian Agricultural Company relinquished its monopoly. Mitchell proceeded to lease out the coal rights on the Burwood estate, with five mines being quickly established by J & A Brown, Donaldson, Alexander Brown, Nott and Morgan.

Because the AACo owned the land between the Burwood estate and the Port of Newcastle the company refused to allow Mitchell to transport coal by rail across its land. Mitchell successfully lobbied the government again by having New South Wales' first Private Act of Parliament titled, Burwood and Newcastle Tramroad Act 1850, passed, that specifically allowed Mitchell to carry coal through AACo lands.

Also in 1850, the coal mining monopoly ended with the peal of the Metallic Ores Act as promised by Governor Gipps, allowing copper to be brought into NSW duty-free. After the monopoly ended, Mitchell established the copper smelter in 1851 until its closure in 1872. In 1913, salvaged bricks from the site were used to cap some of the old mines.

Company towns 
 Stroud
 Carrington 
 Hamilton

Cattle stations
Cattle grazing for the production of beef has long been a focus of the company.

The managing director of AACo. from 1974 to 1988 was Trevor Schmidt, whose family also owned Alroy Downs Station in the Northern Territory.

In 2012 the company entered an agreement with the Bunuba Cattle Company where AACo would manage the operations and the Bunuba would receive and annual rent and training opportunities and have complete access to their lands. The Bunuba hold the leases to Leopold Downs and Fairfield Downs stations, located north of Fitzroy Crossing.

AACo. acquired two properties in the Northern Territory, Welltree and La Belle Stations, in 2013 from R. M. Williams Agricultural Holdings. The properties had been bought for 27.1 million after R. M. Williams went into receivership.

The company owns Anthony Lagoon, Austral Downs, Brunette Downs, Camfield and Delamere Station in the Northern Territory. In Queensland it owns Canobie, Headingly, South Galway, Dalgonally, Carrum, Glentana, Wylarah, Goonoo station and feedlot, Aronui feedlot and Wondoola stations.

See also

 List of companies of Australia
 List of oldest companies in Australia
 Agriculture in Australia
 Avon Downs Station
 East Warrah Woolshed
 Windy Station Woolshed

References

Further reading
 Eardley, Gifford H., The Railways of the South Maitland Coalfields, Australian Railway Historical Society New South Wales Division, 1969, (P/B), National Library of Australia catalogue number AUS 69-2539
 Bairstow Damaris A million pounds A million acres (4,000 km²). Self-published 2003
 Australian Heritage magazine, Autumn 2009

External links 
 
 
 

Agriculture companies of Australia
Companies listed on the Australian Securities Exchange
Australian companies established in 1824
Companies based in Brisbane
Meat industry organizations